The Opuiaki River is a river of the Bay of Plenty Region of New Zealand's North Island.

The river contributes to the Kaimai hydro power scheme built in the 1980s. A dam was built uphill from where the Ngatuhoa Lodge is now. From the dam a tunnel was dug, which channels the water into the Ngatuhoa Stream, where it enters just above another dam built there. Provisions are made to maintain some flow in both streams. Digging the tunnel was a challenging operation due to the geology of the area, formed by volcanic activity from various volcanoes, with clay and other sediment in between. Artesian waters also flow between the layers of rock and contribute to the flow of the streams in the area.

Te Rere I Oturu Falls are on the Opuiaki River, with the coordinates of 37° 55' 34.89" S 175° 59' 55.38" E. The name is based on a legend about a member of the Ngāti Ranginui tribe. His name was Oturu and while being pursued by members of his tribe, he jumped from the falls. The Opuiaki river is mainly rain-fed and the flow can change rapidly during and immediately after a downpour. The falls can be reached via hiking tracks starting at the Ngatuhoa Lodge. A gravel forestry road runs past at some distance, from where a hiking track leads to the falls. The river runs through, and is part of, the Opuiaki Ecological Area, created for the protection of native flora and fauna. The Department of Conservation (DOC) carries out pest control and breeding programs, including for the kōkako, an endangered native bird species.

See also
List of rivers of New Zealand
List of waterfalls of New Zealand

References

Rivers of the Bay of Plenty Region
Rivers of New Zealand